Acacia pustula is a tree belonging to the genus Acacia and the subgenus Phyllodineae native to north eastern Australia.

Description
Like most species of Acacia it has phyllodes rather than true leaves. The variable, evergreen  phyllodes have a linear to narrowly elliptic shape. After flowering thinly coriaceous, mid-brown coloured, linear seed pods form that are linear but slightly raised over seeds.

Taxonomy
The specific epithet is Latin in origin and means blister or pimple-like in reference to the prominence of the marginal gland on the phyllode.

Distribution
It is endemic to south eastern Queensland where the bulk of the population is found between Cracow, Condamin, Kingaroy and Eidsvold with scattered smaller populations in the Carnarvon National Park and Salvator Rosa National Park. where it grows in sandy to sandy loam soils over sandstone as a part of open Eucalyptus woodland communities.

See also
 List of Acacia species

References

pustula
Flora of Queensland
Plants described in 1927
Taxa named by Joseph Maiden
Taxa named by William Blakely